HD77 is a model name of Marantz 4-way high-fidelity loudspeakers which were produced during the mid-1970s. They were bass reflex speakers, but came with a cylindrical piece of foam which fit into the bass-reflex port of the enclosure if the listener preferred the more accurate bass response provided by airtight speaker boxes. However, they were not fully airtight this way, but rather what is known as aperiodic. They were designed by former JBL Engineer Edmond May. The foam plug in port was in fact a "closed-cell" type which did in fact seal cabinet completely. How it worked was it was cut slightly larger than opening and when inserted, you turned the retainer screw and it would tighten and compress the plug, thereby sealing the cabinet to make the loudspeaker a "suspension" type. The controls on baffle are resistive potentiometers, which changed the response curve of corresponding driver from soft to bright, giving great versatility to adapt within almost any listening environment.

Technical details
Weight: 49 lb (21 kg)

Power handling: 250 watts RMS, 330 Watts peak

Impedance: 8 ohms

Physical dimensions
Marantz HD77s had a total volume of  each. The cabinet dimensions are:  

Depth: 12 inches

Width: 15 inches

Height: 28.5 inches

Drivers
The four drivers of the Marantz HD77s are a woofer, mid-range, tweeter and super tweeter. The given frequency responses are what the crossover circuit feed to each speaker, not what each speaker would respond to with no crossover circuit(full spectrum). The mid-range, tweeter and super tweeter have crossover controls for switching between a laboratory "flat" +/- 0db neutral response and a "room EQ" response. Tested frequency response is measured in an anechoic chamber from 20 Hz to 20 kHz, and displayed in a graph shown in original Marantz brochure. Crossover and frequency response are two different things. Crossover points are established for each driver and their specified frequency range. Without crossover points, the drivers would distort and likely overheat and burn out due to the production of the full spectrum of frequencies, with exception of the woofer which inherently struggles with producing higher frequencies. The drivers together create a complete spectrum frequency response.

Woofer

Mid-range
The mid-range is 4.5 inches in diameter with a frequency response of 500 hertz to 3 kilohertz.

Tweeter
The tweeter is a  LPF film dome-type. The tweeter's frequency response is from 3 kHz to 8 kHz.

Super tweeter
The super tweeter is a 1-inch LPF film dome with response from 8 to 23 kHz, which extends 3 kHz above the nominal range of audio frequencies which can be heard by the human ear.

References
Classic Audio. Marantz HD770

Loudspeakers